Kenneth E. Brailsford is an American multi-level marketing entrepreneur, investor and philanthropist. He co-founded the company Nature's Sunshine and founded Enrich International and Zija International.

Early life and education 

Brailsford was born in 1944 in Niagara Falls, New York, to Robert Earl and Freeda Webster Brailsford. He served in the US Army for two years after graduating from Brigham Young University with a degree in economics in 1969.

Career 

Brailsford co-founded Nature's Sunshine in 1972 and served as President of the company from 1972-1979. After leaving Nature's Sunshine, he went to work as a stockbroker for a short time, but then reemerged in the herbal industry once his non-compete agreement with Nature's Sunshine had expired. Brailsford then went on to help launch Nature's Labs Inc., later renamed Enrich International. He worked there from 1985-1997 and retired in 1997.

In 2006, he founded Zija International. Isagenix lists it was founded in 2005 and Dave Andrews founded  it in 2004.David A Andrews conceived the idea and brought it to Ken for financial backing.  Seems some information was not disclosed Brailsford owns a private equity firm, KEB Enterprises L.P., that manages other business investments.

Awards 

Ernst and Young Entrepreneur of the Year (1994)
UVU Outstanding Alumni Award (2015)
Utah's #1 Fastest-Growing Company Zija International (2014)

Personal life 

Ken married his college sweetheart, Linda Hughes Brailsford, and they are the parents of six children, twenty-four grandchildren, and seven great grandchildren. He and his wife currently live in Park City, Utah.

Brailsford is a member of the Church of Jesus Christ of Latter-day Saints. Among other assignments, Brailsford has served as a bishop, stake clerk, counselor in a stake presidency, and from 2005 to 2008 as president of the church's Columbia South Carolina mission.

References 

American businesspeople
1944 births
Living people